The FIRS Index is a share index of the 13 privatisation-investment funds (PIFs) listed on the Banja Luka Stock Exchange (BLSE), established on 29 July 2004. FIRS stands for Indeks investicionih fondova Republike Srpske, which is Serbian for Investment Funds Index of Republika Srpska.

The highest value of the index to 22 September 2006, was on that day, at 4467.74.

Other indices on the Banja Luka Stock Exchange are the BIRS (an index of 12 leading shares) and ERS10 (an index of 10 companies from the power utility sector).

All of the companies listed on this index include the abbreviation a.d. (akcionarsko drušvo) at the end of their name, indicating their status of a public limited company.

List of FIRS companies 
Below is the list of the 13 FIRS companies on 30 August 2006. 
 Balkan Investment Fond a.d. Banja Luka
 PIF Bors Invest Fond a.d. Banja Luka
 Euroinvest Fond a.d. Banja Luka
 PIF Aktiva Invest Fond a.d. Gradiška
 PIF Invest Nova Fond a.d. Bijeljina
 PIF Jahorina-Konseko a.d. Istočno Sarajevo – Pale
 Kristal Invest Fond a.d Banja Luka
 Polara Invest Fond a.d. Banja Luka
 PIF Privrednik a.d. Banja Luka
 PIF VB Fond a.d. Banja Luka
 PIF VIB Fond a.d. Banja Luka
 PIF Zepter Fond a.d. Banja Luka

Performance

See also 
 Republika Srpska Securities Commission

External links

 Banja Luka Stock Exchange

Economy of Bosnia and Herzegovina
Economy of Republika Srpska
Economy of Banja Luka
European stock market indices